Hestiochora occidentalis is a moth of the family Zygaenidae. It is endemic to the temperate parts of Western Australia.

The length of the forewings is 7.5–9 mm for males and 8.5–9 mm for females. It is a tropical species with possibly several generations per year.

The biology is unknown, but the species has been found on localities dominated by Eucalyptus calophylla, Eucalyptus marginata and Eucalyptus rudis.

External links
Australian Faunal Directory
Zygaenid moths of Australia: a revision of the Australian Zygaenidae

Procridinae
Moths described in 2005